"Knock" is a science fiction short story by American writer Fredric Brown. It begins with a piece of Flash fiction based on the following passage by Thomas Bailey Aldrich:

Fredric Brown condensed this text into "a sweet little action story that is only two sentences long". "Knock" then goes on to elaborate on those two sentences and build a more complete plot around them.

It was published in the December 1948 issue of Thrilling Wonder Stories. There have been three different radio adaptations (Dimension X, X Minus One and Sci Fi Channel's Seeing Ear Theatre). The story was reprinted in The Best Science Fiction Stories: 1949

Plot summary
The first two lines are a complete story by themselves:

Reception

The story won the 2012 Cordwainer Smith Rediscovery Award; James Nicoll, however, describes it as "fairly conventional".

References

External links 
 
Dimension X: "Knock", 06 May 1950
X Minus One: "Knock", 22 May 1955

1948 short stories
Science fiction short stories
Short stories by Fredric Brown
Works originally published in Wonder Stories